Phaeopholiota is a fungal genus in the family Agaricaceae. A monotypic genus, it contains the single Himalayan species Phaeopholiota crinipellis, described as new to science in 1983.

See also
 List of Agaricaceae genera
 List of Agaricales genera

References

Agaricaceae
Fungi of Asia
Monotypic Agaricales genera
Taxa named by Marcel Locquin
Taxa described in 1983